Northwood Cemetery is a cemetery located in the West Oak Lane neighborhood of Philadelphia, Pennsylvania, United States. It was established in 1878.

Notable interments
 George Bradley (1852–1931) Major League Baseball player.
 Duke Esper (1868–1910) Major League Baseball Player. Born Charles Esbacher.
 William "Kid" Gleason (1866–1933) Major League Baseball player and manager.
 Eddie Griffin (1982–2007) Professional Basketball Player.Philadelphia Inquirer
 George Hesselbacher, Major League Baseball player.
 John Miller (1839–1882) Civil War Congressional Medal of Honor Recipient (true name Henry Fey). He was a Private in the 8th New York Cavalry.
 Frank Bernard Nicholls (1877–1924), English-American golf professional
 Sister Rosetta Tharpe (1915–1973) Pioneering gospel singer, songwriter and recording artist.
 Dave Zearfoss (1868–1945) Professional Baseball Player.

The cemetery contains 5 Commonwealth war graves, a Canadian Army soldier of World War I and 4 British naval personnel of World War II.

References

External links

 Northwood Cemetery at Find-A-Grave
 Northwood Cemetery at Interment.net

Cemeteries established in the 1870s
Cemeteries in Philadelphia
1878 establishments in Pennsylvania
West Oak Lane, Philadelphia